Yichuan County is a county in the west of Henan province, China. It is under the administration of the prefecture-level city of Luoyang.

Yichuan is known as the "City of Wine". Chinese rice wine is claimed to have been invented here by Dukang during the reign of Shaokang of the Xia. Dukang wine is now exported to Japan, the United States, Canada, Thailand, and more than 45 other countries.

Administrative divisions
As 2012, this county is divided to 5 towns and 9 townships.
Towns

Chengguan
Minggao
Shuizhai
Pengpo
Gaoshan

Townships

Yaling Township
Pingdeng Township
Jiuhou Township
Gezhai Township
Baiyuan Township
Baisha Township
Banpo Township
Jiangzuo Township
Lüdian Township

Climate

References

 
Luoyang
County-level divisions of Henan